Plinthograptis ebogana is a species of moth of the family Tortricidae. It is found in Cameroon and Ghana.

Its wingspan is about 15 mm. The ground colour is bluish grey and the costa and termen are edged orange yellow with black grey spots. There is a large, paler blotch from the mid-termen with inner blackish marks. There is also a large tornal blotch, also with blackish inner spots. There are red markings. The hindwings are brown.

The larvae feed on Theobroma cacao.

References

Moths described in 2005
Tortricini
Moths of Africa
Taxa named by Józef Razowski